The Afghan Women's Council (AWC) (also known as the Women's Council) was a women's organization. In Afghanistan. It was a non-profit organization that strived to help Afghan women and children by improving their living condition as well as raising the awareness of human rights.

In 1990, the Democratic Women's Organisation of Afghanistan was abolished because it was considered too Marxist in a period when President Najibullah wished to appease the Islamic resistance. It was replaced with the Afghan Women's Council, which was a more apolitical women's organisation.

Until 1989, the leader of the organization was Masuma Esmati-Wardak, Wardak was not a member of the People's Democratic Party of Afghanistan (PDPA) and in 1991 she became Minister of Education.

The organization was run by Wardak and a staff of eight women. Some of these staff members were also members of the PDPA. When the communist regime began in 1978, under Nur Muhammad Taraki, the government gave equal rights to women. Women now had the ability to make decisions about their own lives. The membership of the AWC was around 150,000 around the country and had branches and bases in all Afghan provinces except Wardak and Katawaz. Most of the women in Kabul resisted the Mujahideen because of their retrogressive laws concerning women.

The AWC provided social services to women in Afghanistan, in the fight against illiteracy and vocational training for those in the Secretary, hairdressing and workshop fields. Many feared the sacrificing of the AWC in the national reconciliation talks, which started in 1987.

One of the most important AWC programmes was the fight for the literacy and education of girls. According to an AWC survey, in 1991, an estimated 7 thousand women were in institutions of higher education and around 230,000 girls studying in schools around Afghanistan. According to the survey, there existed about 190 female professors and 22,000 female teachers in the country.

See also 
 Women's rights in Afghanistan
 Women's Welfare Association

References 

People's Democratic Party of Afghanistan
Women's wings of political parties
Women's rights in Afghanistan
Women's organisations based in Afghanistan
Feminist organisations in Afghanistan